There have been two Christian dioceses named after the country of Belize. They are : 

the Anglican Diocese of Belize
the Roman Catholic Diocese of Belize City-Belmopan, formerly the Roman Catholic Diocese of Belize